In seven-dimensional geometry, a cantellated 7-simplex is a convex uniform 7-polytope, being a cantellation of the regular 7-simplex.

There are unique 6 degrees of cantellation for the 7-simplex, including truncations.

Cantellated 7-simplex

Alternate names
 Small rhombated octaexon (acronym: saro) (Jonathan Bowers)

Coordinates 
The vertices of the cantellated 7-simplex can be most simply positioned in 8-space as permutations of (0,0,0,0,0,1,1,2). This construction is based on facets of the cantellated 8-orthoplex.

Images

Bicantellated 7-simplex

Alternate names
 Small birhombated octaexon (acronym: sabro) (Jonathan Bowers)

Coordinates 
The vertices of the bicantellated 7-simplex can be most simply positioned in 8-space as permutations of (0,0,0,0,1,1,2,2). This construction is based on facets of the bicantellated 8-orthoplex.

Images

Tricantellated 7-simplex

Alternate names
 Small trirhombihexadecaexon (stiroh) (Jonathan Bowers)

Coordinates 
The vertices of the tricantellated 7-simplex can be most simply positioned in 8-space as permutations of (0,0,0,1,1,2,2,2). This construction is based on facets of the tricantellated 8-orthoplex.

Images

Cantitruncated 7-simplex

Alternate names
 Great rhombated octaexon (acronym: garo) (Jonathan Bowers)

Coordinates 
The vertices of the cantitruncated 7-simplex can be most simply positioned in 8-space as permutations of (0,0,0,0,0,1,2,3). This construction is based on facets of the cantitruncated 8-orthoplex.

Images

Bicantitruncated 7-simplex

Alternate names
 Great birhombated octaexon (acronym: gabro) (Jonathan Bowers)

Coordinates 

The vertices of the bicantitruncated 7-simplex can be most simply positioned in 8-space as permutations of (0,0,0,0,1,2,3,3). This construction is based on facets of the bicantitruncated 8-orthoplex.

Images

Tricantitruncated 7-simplex

Alternate names
 Great trirhombihexadecaexon (acronym: gatroh) (Jonathan Bowers)

Coordinates 

The vertices of the tricantitruncated 7-simplex can be most simply positioned in 8-space as permutations of (0,0,0,1,2,3,4,4). This construction is based on facets of the tricantitruncated 8-orthoplex.

Images

Related polytopes 

This polytope is one of 71 uniform 7-polytopes with A7 symmetry.

See also
List of A7 polytopes

Notes

References
 H.S.M. Coxeter: 
 H.S.M. Coxeter, Regular Polytopes, 3rd Edition, Dover New York, 1973 
 Kaleidoscopes: Selected Writings of H.S.M. Coxeter, edited by F. Arthur Sherk, Peter McMullen, Anthony C. Thompson, Asia Ivic Weiss, Wiley-Interscience Publication, 1995,  
 (Paper 22) H.S.M. Coxeter, Regular and Semi Regular Polytopes I, [Math. Zeit. 46 (1940) 380-407, MR 2,10]
 (Paper 23) H.S.M. Coxeter, Regular and Semi-Regular Polytopes II, [Math. Zeit. 188 (1985) 559-591]
 (Paper 24) H.S.M. Coxeter, Regular and Semi-Regular Polytopes III, [Math. Zeit. 200 (1988) 3-45]
 Norman Johnson Uniform Polytopes, Manuscript (1991)
 N.W. Johnson: The Theory of Uniform Polytopes and Honeycombs, Ph.D. 
  x3o3x3o3o3o3o - saro, o3x3o3x3o3o3o - sabro, o3o3x3o3x3o3o - stiroh, x3x3x3o3o3o3o - garo, o3x3x3x3o3o3o - gabro, o3o3x3x3x3o3o - gatroh

External links 
 Polytopes of Various Dimensions
 Multi-dimensional Glossary

7-polytopes